The Hot Rock can refer to:
 The Hot Rock, the first (1970) John Dortmunder novel by Donald E. Westlake
 The Hot Rock (film), a 1972 movie based on the novel
 The Hot Rock (album), a 1999 album by Sleater-Kinney
 Hot Rock Energy, A.k.a. Hot dry rock geothermal energy